A list of the earliest films produced in Hong Kong from the first film in 1909 to 1949 in year order.

See also
List of films set in Hong Kong

References

Bibliography

1900-1950
Films
Lists of 1900s films
Films
Lists of 1910s films
Films
Lists of 1920s films
Films
Lists of 1930s films
Films
Lists of 1940s films